Kawika is a Hawaiian name meaning "David". 

Notable people with the name include:

 Kawika Crowley (born 1952), Japanese-American politician 
 Kawika Kapahulehua (1930–2007), Hawaiian sailor
 Kawika Mitchell (born 1979), American football player 
 Kawika Shoji (born 1987), American volleyball player
 Justin Kawika Young (born 1978), American singer
 Rap Reiplinger (1950-1984), American comedian whose full name is James Kawika Piʻimauna "Rap" Reiplinger

See also
 David (name), including lists of people with the name
 "Kawika", a song from The Sunday Manoa's 1971 album Guava Jam